is a Japanese voice actress and singer from Nagano Prefecture.

Biography
After graduating from high school, Ito attended the Amusement Media Academy in 2007. She played Amu Hinamori in Shugo Chara!. Her role was praised by critics, and later appeared in radio serials, drama CDs and video games. Ito played Fumino Serizawa in Mayoi Neko Overrun! and Airi in Queen's Blade. She and Aki Toyosaki starred on several series, including Shugo Chara!, To Love-Ru, The World God Only Knows, Hanasaku Iroha and A Certain Scientific Railgun (they also hosted the A Certain Scientific Railgun web radio show, Radio no Railgun). Ito won the awards at the 4th Seiyu Awards and the 5th Seiyu Awards.

Filmography

Television animation
2007
Hatara Kizzu Maihamu Gumi – Kumi
Shugo Chara! – Amu Hinamori, Diamond

2008
Birdy the Mighty: Decode – Natsumi Hayamiya
Shugo Chara!! Doki— – Amu Hinamori, Diamond

2009
Birdy the Mighty Decode: 02 – Natsumi Hayamiya
Kiddy Girl-and – Belle 
One Piece - Boa Hancock (child)
Queen's Blade: The Exiled Virgin – Airi
Queen's Blade 2: The Evil Eye – Airi
Shugo Chara!! Party! – Amu Hinamori, Diamond
Sora no Manimani – Mihoshi Akeno
Taishō Baseball Girls – Koume Suzukawa
A Certain Scientific Railgun – Ruiko Saten
To Love Ru – Nana Astar Deviluke

2010
Mayoi Neko Overrun! – Fumino Serizawa, Sayaka
Kyō, Koi o Hajimemasu (OVA) – Tsubaki Hibino
Okami-san and Her Seven Companions – Ringo Akai
Cat Planet Cuties – Elis
Motto To Love Ru – Nana Astar Deviluke
Squid Girl – Sanae Nagatsuki
The World God Only Knows – Elsie de Lute Ima

2011
Haganai – Sena Kashiwazaki
Code:Breaker – Nyanmaru
Hanasaku Iroha – Ohana Matsumae
Last Exile: Fam, the Silver Wing – Sara Augusta
Nekogami Yaoyorozu – Amane
Pretty Rhythm Aurora Dream – Mega-nee Akai, Kaname Chris, Sonata Kanzaki (young), Narrator
Ro-Kyu-Bu! – Aoi Ogiyama
Sacred Seven – Wakana Itō
Shinryaku!? Ika Musume – Sanae Nagatsuki
Softenni – Asuna Harukaze
The World God Only Knows II – Elucia de Rux Ima
The World God Only Knows OVA: 4 Girls and an Idol – Elucia de Rux Ima

2012
Mobile Suit Gundam AGE – Lu Anon
Pretty Rhythm: Dear My Future – Mega-nee Akai, Hye In, Kaname Chris
Shinryaku!! Ika Musume (OVA) – Sanae Nagatsuki
Shining Hearts: Shiawase no Pan – Amil
Sword Art Online – Yui
The Ambition of Oda Nobuna – Nobuna Oda
The World God Only Knows OVA: Tenri Arc – Elucia de Rux Ima
To Love Ru Darkness – Nana Astar Deviluke

2013
Haganai NEXT – Sena Kashiwazaki
Fate/kaleid liner Prisma Illya – Suzuka Kurihara
Hanasaku Iroha: Home Sweet Home – Ohana Matsumae
Photo Kano – Haruka Niimi
Pretty Rhythm: Rainbow Live – Mega-nee Akai, Starn
Ro-Kyu-Bu! SS – Aoi Ogiyama
Strike the Blood – Kanon Kanase
The Devil Is a Part-Timer! – Suzuno Kamazuki/Crestia Bell
The World God Only Knows III – Elucia de Rux Ima
A Certain Scientific Railgun S – Ruiko Saten
A Certain Magical Index: The Movie – The Miracle of Endymion – Ruiko Saten

2014
Fate/Kaleid liner Prisma Illya 2wei! – Suzuka Kurihara
Girl Friend Beta – Marika Saeki
Nanana's Buried Treasure – Yumeji Yurika
Ōkami Shōjo to Kuro Ōji – Erika Shinohara
Persona 4: The Animation – Ebihara Ai
PriPara – Mega-nee Akai
Sword Art Online II – Yui

2015
Magical Girl Lyrical Nanoha ViVid – Miura Rinaldi (eps. 6 - 12)
To Love Ru Darkness 2nd – Nana Astar Deviluke
Aikatsu! – Kokone Kurisu
Tai-Madō Gakuen 35 Shiken Shōtai – Mari Nikaidō
God Eater – Hibari Takeda

2016
Divine Gate – Midori
High School Fleet – Kinesaki Homare, Kinesaki Akane
One Piece – Carrot
Love Live! Sunshine!! – Mito Takami
ViVid Strike! – Miura Rinaldi

2017
Kemono Friends – Gray wolf (ep. 10, 12)
Granblue Fantasy the Animation – Sturm (ep. 2 - 7)
Angel's 3Piece! – Sakura Toriumi
Kirakira PreCure a la Mode – Bibury other voiced by Chiemi Chiba
Land of the Lustrous – Amethyst

2018
 Gundam Build Divers – Nanami Nanase
Harukana Receive – Ayasa Tachibana
 Kiratto Pri Chan – Meganée Akai

2019
A Certain Scientific Accelerator – Ruiko Saten

2020
A Certain Scientific Railgun T – Ruiko Saten

2021
Full Dive – Cathy
So I'm a Spider, So What? – Sachi Kudou
Waccha PriMagi! – Udoku Sawake
180-Byō de Kimi no Mimi o Shiawase ni Dekiru ka? – Udoku Sawake

2022
The Devil Is a Part-Timer!! – Suzuno Kamazuki/Crestia Bell

2023
The Legend of Heroes: Trails of Cold Steel – Northern War – Campanella

Original net animation
2022
Bastard!! -Heavy Metal, Dark Fantasy- – Lucien Renlen

Theatrical animation
2011
Children Who Chase Lost Voices – Seri

2017
Sword Art Online The Movie: Ordinal Scale – Yui

2020
High School Fleet: The Movie – Kinesaki Homare, Kinesaki Akane

Video games
 7th Dragon 2020-II - Unit 13
 7th Dragon III Code: VFD - Unit 13
 The Legend of Heroes: Trails to Azure – Campanella
 The Legend of Heroes: Trails of Cold Steel III – Campanella
 The Legend of Heroes: Trails of Cold Steel IV – Campanella, Grandmaster
 Accel World VS Sword Art Online: Millennium Twilight - Yui, Persona Vabel
 Boku wa Tomodachi ga Sukunai Portable – Sena Kashiwazaki
 Chaos Rings III - Leary
 Digimon Story: Cyber Sleuth - Yuuko Kamishiro
 Digimon Story: Cyber Sleuth - Hacker's Memory - Yuuko Kamishiro
 Dragon Ball Xenoverse – Supreme Kai of Time
 Dragon Ball Xenoverse 2 - Supreme Kai of Time
 Dragon Ball Heroes - Supreme Kai of Time
 Durarara!!3way standoff - Chiaki Igarashi
 Dynasty Warriors,Warriors Orochi series and Musou Stars – Wang Yuanji
 Fate/Grand Order – Trưng Nhị
 Fragile Dreams: Farewell Ruins of the Moon – Girl, Servant 2
 Girls' Frontline - Am RFB, Shipka
 God Eater and God Eater 2 series – Hibari Takeda 
 Granblue Fantasy – Sturm
Honkai Impact 3rd – Timido Cute
 Hyperdimension Neptunia – Red
 Ima Sugu Oniichan ni Imōto da tte Iitai! – Nanase Matsuri
 Kemono Friends – Keroro Girl Type
 Lightning Returns: Final Fantasy XIII – Lumina
 Magia Record: Puella Magi Madoka Magica Side Story - Rika Ayano
 Million Arthur – Faye 
 One Piece: Pirate Warriors 4 – Carrot
 Photo Kano – Haruka Niimi
 Persona 4 – Ai Ebihara, Yumi Ozawa
 Pretty Rhythm: Mini Skirt - Mega-nee Akai, Rizumu Amamiya
 Pretty Rhythm: Aurora Dream - Mega-nee Akai
 Pretty Rhythm: Dear My Future - Mega-nee Akai
 Pretty Rhythm: My Deco Rainbow Wedding - Mega-nee Akai
 Pretty Rhythm: Rainbow Live - Mega-nee Akai
 Pretty Rhythm: Rainbow Live Duo - Mega-nee Akai
 Pretty Rhythm: Rainbow Live: Kirakira My Design - Mega-nee Akai
 Pretty Rhythm: All Star Legend Coord Edition - Mega-nee Akai
 PriPara - Mega-nee Akai
 Idol Time PriPara - Mega-nee Akai
 Kiratto Pri Chan - Mega-nee Akai
 Rune Factory Oceans – Elena
 Shining Hearts – Nellis, Amyl, Aerie
 Sword Art Online: Infinity Moment – Yui
 Tales of the World: Radiant Mythology 2 – Kanonno Earhart
 Tales of the World: Radiant Mythology 3 – Kanonno Earhart
 Toaru Kagaku no Railgun – Ruiko Saten
 Toaru Majutsu to Kagaku no Ensemble – Ruiko Saten
 Tokyo Babel – Sorami Kugutsu
 Valkyria Chronicles - Aisha Neumann, Nadine, Jane Turner
 Valkyrie Drive -Bhikkhuni-: Ranka Kagurazaka
 Counter: Side - Dash/Spira

Dubbing roles
 Cats and Peachtopia – Cape

Discography

Albums

Singles

References

External links
  
 

1986 births
Living people
Anime singers
Aoni Production voice actors
Japanese video game actresses
Japanese voice actresses
Lantis (company) artists
Musicians from Nagano Prefecture
Voice actresses from Nagano Prefecture
21st-century Japanese women singers
21st-century Japanese singers